Mampong is a town in the Mampong Municipal of Ashanti and serves as the administrative capital of Mampong Municipal. Mampong has a population of 42,037 people. Mampong is also the centre of the new Anglican Diocese of Asante Mampong, inaugurated in 2014.

Education 
The Amaniampong Senior High School is located in Mampong.

Namesakes 
There are several settlements in the Ashanti Region with this name.

Notable residents 

 Mohammed Aminu
 Yaa Gyasi (born 1989), author
 J. H. Kwabena Nketia (1921-2019), ethnomusicologist and composer
 Ebenezer Augustus Kwasi Akuoko (b. 1928), lawyer
 Akwasi Amankwa Afrifa (1936–1979), soldier and politician
 Gerald Asamoah (b. 1978), retired footballer who played for the German national team and FC Schalke
 Akwasi Ampofo Adjei, founder and leader of Kumapim Royals Band, a renowned highlife musician
Benjamin Samuel Kofi Kwakye, former Inspector General of Police of the Ghana Police Service
 Agyeman Badu Akosa (1953 to date), Ghanaian educator, politician, pathologist 
 Reginald Reynolds Amponsah (b. 1919), potter, politician, former Minister of State
Kwaku Ampratwum-Sarpong (b. 1958), former Deputy High Commissioner and Member of Parliament

Villages

Note
The centre for Plant Medicine is not in Mampong Ashanti but in Akuapim Mampong in the Eastern Region. Ashante Mampong however serves as an educational hub in the Ashanti Region with institutions such as University of Winneba College of Agriculture, Mampong Technical College of Education, St Monica's College of Education, Mampong Nursing and Midwifery Training College, 3 senior high schools and numerous junior high and elementary schools.

References 

Populated places in the Ashanti Region